Matthew Benjamin Brown (born August 8, 1982 in Bellevue, Washington) is a former third baseman. Brown was selected by the Anaheim Angels in the 10th round of the 2001 Major League Baseball Draft out of Coeur d'Alene (Idaho) High School.

Career
He debuted on May 10, flying out to left field in a pinch-hit appearance against the Cleveland Indians. He was batting .326 with 21 home runs and 67 RBI for the Angels' Triple-A Pacific Coast League affiliate, the Salt Lake Bees when his season ended as a result of being selected for the  USA Baseball Olympic Team.

Brown signed a minor league contract with the Minnesota Twins in December 2010 to provide organizational depth behind third baseman Danny Valencia. He last played for the Acereros de Monclova in the Mexican League in 2012.

References

External links

1982 births
Living people
Acereros de Monclova players
American expatriate baseball players in Mexico
Arizona League Angels players
Arizona League Rangers players
Arkansas Travelers players
Baseball players at the 2008 Summer Olympics
Baseball players from Washington (state)
Cedar Rapids Kernels players
Los Angeles Angels players
Major League Baseball third basemen
Medalists at the 2008 Summer Olympics
Mexican League baseball third basemen
Olympic bronze medalists for the United States in baseball
Oklahoma City RedHawks players
Provo Angels players
Rancho Cucamonga Quakes players
Rochester Red Wings players
Salt Lake Bees players